The 2013–14 season was West Bromwich Albion's fourth consecutive season in the Premier League, their eighth in total. During the season, they also competed in the League Cup and the FA Cup.

Season summary
Steve Clarke was sacked in December following four consecutive defeats, which left Albion in 16th place. He was replaced by former Real Betis manager Pepe Mel, who guided Albion to safety despite only winning 3 of his 18 matches in charge. At the end of the season, Mel's contract was terminated by mutual consent; he was replaced by Everton's academy manager Alan Irvine.

Players

First-team squad
Squad at end of season

Left club during season

Player statistics
Numbers in parentheses denote appearances as substitute.
Players with no appearances not included in the list.

As of 11 May 2014

* – One booking in League Cup
+ – One booking in FA Cup
Source:

Results

Pre-season
During pre-season, Albion installed the Hawk-Eye system at their home ground, The Hawthorns, in order to enable the newly introduced goal-line technology for the 2013–14 season.

Overall

Premier League
Albion participated in the 2013–14 Premier League.

League table

Results summary

Results by matchday

Matches

 All matches on 11–14 April kicked off 7 minutes after the originally scheduled time, to mark the 25th anniversary of the Hillsborough disaster.

FA Cup

League Cup
Albion participated in the 2013–14 Football League Cup. At half-time in their home tie against Arsenal, the club were presented with a blue plaque as one of the 12 founder members of the Football League, which was celebrating its 125th anniversary. The plaque was later displayed on the outside of the East Stand at The Hawthorns.

Transfers

In

Out

Notes
 Zoltán Gera was re-signed by West Bromwich Albion before the start of the 2013–14 season.

Notes

References

West Bromwich Albion F.C. seasons
West Bromwich Albion